The Great Little Box Company (GLBC) is a Canadian company which manufactures custom and stock corrugated boxes, point-of-purchase displays, digital print and packaging, labels and flexible packaging, folding cartons, and protective packaging. The company also distributes shipping and moving supplies. In addition to its Richmond head office, the company has distribution locations in Kelowna and Victoria, British Columbia, Everett, Washington, and a satellite office in Alberta. The Great Little Box Company has won a number of awards for business excellence.

Timeline
The company was founded in 1982, and began with three employees and some second-hand machinery.

As the company grew, it began selling moving supplies in 2004 and in 2006 a label and plastics division was added.

In 2007 the company acquired Boxstar Industries. By 2008 it employed 170 people and by 2012 it had about 250 employees.

In 2014 the Great Little Box Company merged with the Great West Paper Box Company; it was then the largest box-maker in Western Canada.

In 2015 the company operated from four locations in British Columbia and Washington state and employed about 270 people.

In 2020 Great Little Box Company acquired Ideon Packaging.

In 2020 the Everett location expanded to a 28,000 sqft facility on Riverside Road.

In 2022 Great Little Box Company celebrated their 40th anniversary with almost 500 employees

Awards
Awards won by The Great Little Box Company include:
Canada's Top Small & Medium Employer (2022 - 2005)
BC's Top Employer (2023- 2005)
Canada's Best Managed Company (2022 - 2004)
Richmond Chamber of Commerce Business Excellence Awards Hall of Fame (2019)
Waterstone Canada's Most Admired Corporate Cultures (2018, 2012)
Business Excellence Award for Outstanding Workplace by the Richmond Chamber of Commerce (2018)
Best Company to work for in BC (BC Business Magazine & Watson Wyatt): 1st place in 2006
Financial Posts Top 10 Companies to work for in BC (2006, 2012)
Canada's Top 100 Employers (Maclean's: 2005–2007 and 2015)
BC Top 30 employers (2005–2007)
Canada's 50 best managed companies (1995, 1999, 2004)
Quality Council of BC Award of Distinction: 1997 (for People Focus) and 1999 (for Customer Focus).

Among the management policies which led to these awards were the practice of giving employees open access to the company's financial records, profit-sharing options and recreational facilities.

As a Great Manufacturer

FSEA Gold Leaf Awards

 2022 Silver - Label - Best use of Holographic  (Russell Brewing Belgian Dubbel)

TLMI Annual Awards Competition

 2022 1st place - Flexography, Line, Prime - Backcountry Brewing Trailbreaker Pale Ale·
 2021 2nd place - Toner- Pressure sensitive-color process-prime - Dakota Nutrition Apple Cider Vinegar Gummies

Box Manufacturing Olympics (AICC/ TAPPI)

o  2021 Gold – Folding Carton -Cosmetics (Routine Natural Soap)

o  2021 Gold & Bronze – Corrugate Display Print & Structure (Strait & Narrow)

o  2021 Gold – Corrugate Display Structure (Performatrin Ultra)

o  2021 Bronze – Corrugate replacing other substrate (BC Fresh Potato Basket & Tray)2021- Coupe Beverages - Duchess Cosmopolitan Box

FTA Excellence in Flexography Awards

o  2021- Coupe Beverages - Duchess Cosmopolitan Box

PPC Paperboard Packaging Council Competition

o  2022 - Gold Award - Brand & Iron Origami Candle Box

o  2022 - Excellence Award - Om Skincare Beauty Line

o  2021 - Excellence Award - Uno Gelato Pint Carrier

o  2021- Excellence Award - Taco Fino Kids Takeout Box

o  2021 - Excellence Award - Uno Gelato Pint Carrier

o  2020 - Excellence Award in Sustainability (Big Marble Farms)

o  2020- Excellence Award (Harken Coffee & VI Brewing Pod Pack)

o  2018 - Boxmaker Award– Structural Design (Skinphoria)

o  2016 - Gold Award (Little Belgians)

o  2014 – Gold Award & Excellence Winner (Rocky Mtn/ Purdy's)

·       The Independent Packaging Association

o   2019 – Innovative Structural Design & Judge's choice – 1st (Liquidity Winery)

o   2019 – Folding Carton – Retail Food & Beverage & Judge's choice – 1st (Harken Coffee)

o   2017 - Innovative Structural Design, Con & Ind Focus – 3rd  (4-Pack Crate)

o   2017 – Counter, Shelf Power Wing & PDQ displays – 3rd  (NASCAR display)

o   2017 - Folding Carton – Confections - 1st & 3rd  (La Churreria/ Moonshine Donuts)

o  2017 - Folding Carton – Family of Packages – 2nd  (Temper Pastry)

o  2017 - Folding Carton – Improvement over former package – 2nd (Temper)

o  2017 - Folding Carton – Judges’ Choice  (La Churreria)

·       Tappi Corrpak Corrugated Design Competition (2008, 2007, 2006, 2004, 2003)

o  2014 – Structure/ Floor Displays – 1st  (Aritizia)

o  2014 – Flexo Printing -Combined Brown Brd -1st & 2nd (Fiasco Gelato/ Aritizia)

o  2014 – Combined Techniques – 1st & 2nd   (Fiasco Gelato/ Aritizia)

o  2014 – Structure - Best of Show  (Fiasco Gelato)

o  2014 – Structure - Attendee's Favourite  (Aritizia)

o  2012 – Structure – Shelf Shipper Displays – 2nd  (Brookside60)

o  2009 - Floor display – 2nd

o  2008 - Protective Packaging- 1st & 2nd

·       Packaging Impressions Excellence Awards

o  2020 - Corrugated Offset - 1st (Victoria Distillers - Empress 1908 Gin Kit)

o  2020 - Labels - Flexo - 2nd (Strathcona Beer Company)

o  2019 - Corrugated Flexo- 1st (Tea Runners)

o  2019 - Wine & Beer Labels – 1st (Red truck Lager)

o  2019 -  Labels Digital – 3rd (Iggy's)

o  2015 – Labels Flexo  - 2nd

·

References 

Packaging companies of Canada